Hugh Cathcart Thompson (1829–1919) was an American architect from Tennessee.

Early life
High Cathcart Thomson was born in 1829.

Career
Thompson designed fifty-six buildings during his career as an architect in Nashville, Tennessee. Only nine are still standing.

In 1887, he designed Baxter Court for Jere Baxter (1852–1904), located at 307–311 on Church Street in Nashville, Tennessee. It was home to the Chamber of Commerce. However, it was demolished in 1970. In 1889, he designed the First Methodist Church in McMinnville, Tennessee, which is listed on the National Register of Historic Places listings in Warren County, Tennessee.

In 1891, Thompson designed the Ryman Auditorium at 116 5th Avenue North in Nashville. It is listed on the National Register of Historic Places listings in Davidson County, Tennessee. That same year, he designed the Utopia Hotel located at 206 4th Avenue North in Nashville, also listed on the National Register of Historic Places. Additionally, he designed the Community Baptist Church on the corner of South Douglas and Elliott Avenues in the Waverly Place Historic District, a neighbourhood in Nashville listed on the National Register of Historic Places.

Thompson also designed the private residence of Volney James on the southwest corner of Fatherland and Fifth Streets in East Nashville, which was demolished in 1963.

Death
Thompson died in 1919.

Secondary source
William W. Howell. Hugh Cathcart Thompson, Native Tennessee Architect. Knoxville, Tennessee: University of Tennessee Press. 1975.

References

1829 births
1919 deaths
People from Nashville, Tennessee
Architects from Tennessee